Tim Beck may refer to:
 Tim Beck (American football, born 1964), American football head coach for the Pittsburg State University Gorillas in Kansas
 Tim Beck (American football, born 1966), American football head coach for the Costal Carolina Chanticleers.

See also
 Timothy Beck (born 1977), Dutch sprinter
 Timothy James Beck, American pseudonymous novelist
 Tim Beckham (born 1990), American baseball player
 Tim Beckman (born 1965), American football head coach